Mount Hermon is an unincorporated community in Monroe County, Kentucky, United States.

References

Monroe County

Unincorporated communities in Monroe County, Kentucky
Unincorporated communities in Kentucky